In Greek mythology, Aesyle, also called Phaesyle (Ancient Greek:   means 'shining' from ) was one of the three or five Hyades, sisters that were rain-bringing nymphs. She was the sister of Eudora and Ambrosia, Polyxo and Coronis, and Cleeia and Phaeo. They were called the daughters of the Titan Atlas by either the Oceanids Aethra or Pleione, or of Hyas and Boeotia.

Notes

References 

 Bell, Robert E., Women of Classical Mythology: A Biographical Dictionary. ABC-Clio. 1991. .
Gaius Julius Hyginus, Astronomica from The Myths of Hyginus translated and edited by Mary Grant. University of Kansas Publications in Humanistic Studies. Online version at the Topos Text Project.

Women in Greek mythology
Characters in Greek mythology